Star One D2, is a Brazilian geostationary communications satellite ordered by Embratel and designed and manufactured by Maxar Technologies on the SSL 1300 satellite bus. It is expected to be stationed on an orbital position at 70.0° West for communications.

Satellite description 
Star One D2 is designed and manufactured by Maxar Technologies for Embratel and part of the SSL 1300 satellite bus group for telecommunications. It will also have 4 communication bands (C-, Ku-, Ka- and X-bands).

Launch 
The launch time and date was 21:00:00 UTC on 30 July 2021.

References 

Communications satellites of the United States
Satellites using the SSL 1300 bus
Ariane commercial payloads